Przelewice may refer to:

Przelewice, Pyrzyce County, a village in Pyrzyce County, West Pomeranian Voivodeship, Poland
Gmina Przelewice, a rural gmina (administrative district) in Pyrzyce County, West Pomeranian Voivodeship
Przelewice, Wałcz County, a village in the administrative district of Gmina Człopa, Wałcz County, West Pomeranian Voivodeship, Poland

See also
Prillwitz
Przywodzie, Gmina Przelewice, a village in the administrative district of Gmina Przelewice, Poland